Cabariot is a commune in the Charente-Maritime department in southwestern France.

Geography
The river Boutonne forms part of the commune's southeastern border, then flows into the Charente, which forms all of its southwestern border.

Population

See also
 Communes of the Charente-Maritime department

References

External links
 

Communes of Charente-Maritime